is a 1968 Japanese film directed by Hiroshi Teshigahara and starring Shintaro Katsu. The screenplay was adapted by Kōbō Abe from his novel The Ruined Map. This was the fifth and final film collaboration between Teshigahara and Abe.

Cast
 Shintaro Katsu – detective
 Etsuko Ichihara – wife
 Osamu Okawa – wife's brother
 Kiyoshi Atsumi – Tashiro
 Tamao Nakamura – detective's wife
 Kinzo Shin – coffee shop owner

References

External links
 

1968 films
1960s Japanese films
Films directed by Hiroshi Teshigahara
1960s Japanese-language films
Toho films